The Crabronidae are a large paraphyletic group (nominally a family) of wasps, including nearly all of the species formerly comprising the now-defunct superfamily Sphecoidea. It collectively includes well over 200 genera, containing well over 9000 species. Crabronids were originally a part of Sphecidae, but the latter name is now restricted to a separate family based on what was once the subfamily Sphecinae. Several of the subfamilies of Crabronidae are often treated as families in their own right, as is true of the most recent phylogenies (example below).

Phylogeny
This phylogenetic tree is based on Sann et al., 2018, which used phylogenomics to demonstrate that both the bees (Anthophila) and the Sphecidae arose from within the former Crabronidae, which is therefore paraphyletic, and which they suggested should be split into several families; the former family Heterogynaidae nests within the Bembicidae, as here defined. These findings differ in several details from studies published by two other sets of authors in 2017, though all three studies demonstrate a paraphyletic "Crabronidae." Only three of these lineages were not included within Crabronidae in the past: Ampulicidae, Sphecidae, and Anthophila.

Subgroups
 Subfamily Astatinae (now ranked as a family)
 Astata, etc.
 Subfamily Bembicinae (now ranked as a family)
 Tribe Alyssontini
 Tribe Bembicini
 Bembix Fabricius 1775
 Zyzzyx Pate 1937, etc.
 Tribe Gorytini
 Gorytes Latreille, 1804
 Sphecius, etc.
 Tribe Heliocausini
 Tribe Nyssonini
 Tribe Stizini
 Subfamily Crabroninae (incl. Eremiaspheciinae and Dinetinae)
 Aha
 Crabro
 Dalara
 Liris
 Pison, etc.
 Subfamily Mellininae (now ranked as a family)
 Mellinus
 Xenosphex
 Subfamily Pemphredoninae (recently split into three families)
 Microstigmus
 Lithium
 Pemphredon, etc.
 Subfamily Philanthinae (now ranked as a family)
 Cerceris
 Philanthus, etc.

Life cycle

See also
 List of Crabronidae genera

References

Sources
 Catalog of Sphecidae sensu lato at Cal Academy

External links

Image Gallery from Gembloux
 Larra spp., mole cricket hunters on the UF / IFAS Featured Creatures Web site

 
Apocrita families